Stage 11 of the 2012 Tour de France was contested on 12 July and the race concluded with Stage 20 on 22 July. The second half of the race was situated entirely within France; starting with a mountain stage from Albertville to La Toussuire-Les Sybelles – incorporating two hors catégorie climbs during the stage – before the customary race-concluding stage finish on the Champs-Élysées in Paris.

Following his victory in the ninth stage individual time trial,  rider Bradley Wiggins held the lead into the second half of the race. He maintained his race lead throughout the second half of the race, holding a lead of 2 minutes and 5 seconds – transpiring from stage 9 – until the race's final individual time trial, held on the penultimate day of the race. Wiggins won the stage by 1 minute and 16 seconds ahead of his team-mate Chris Froome, and Wiggins ultimately held his lead into Paris the following day to win the race overall by 3 minutes and 21 seconds, to become the first rider from Great Britain to win a Grand Tour race. Froome finished second, while the final podium was completed by former Vuelta a España winner Vincenzo Nibali, riding for the  team, who was the only other rider to finish within 10 minutes of Wiggins' final overall time.

Only Wiggins' team-mate Mark Cavendish was able to win more than one stage during the second half of the race, winning two of the final three stages including a fourth consecutive final stage victory in Paris. This victory allowed him to become the most prolific sprinter at the Tour de France with 23 stage victories, surpassing the record of 22 which had been held for 48 years by France's André Darrigade. Three French riders – Pierre Rolland, Pierrick Fédrigo and Thomas Voeckler – each took a stage victory during the second half of the race, with Voeckler's victory in the queen stage helping in part for him to become the eventual winner of the mountains classification. Other stage victories were taken by David Millar, André Greipel, Luis León Sánchez and Alejandro Valverde.

During the fourteenth stage of the race, Wiggins neutralised the peloton on the descent from the Mur de Péguère climb, after carpet tacks were found to be responsible for around thirty punctures on the climb itself. Among those delayed was the defending champion Cadel Evans, who suffered three punctures on the climb and had lost around two minutes before Wiggins called a truce in the main field, allowing the breakaway to finish the stage over eighteen minutes clear of the pack. Following the raid of the  team hotel during the first rest day, the second rest day was marked by a positive drugs test by  rider Fränk Schleck, the third-placed rider from the 2011 race. Schleck quit the race after traces of xipamide, a banned sulfonamide diuretic drug, were found in the A-sample of his urine, and was later confirmed by the B-sample.

Classification standings

Stage 11

12 July 2012 — Albertville to La Toussuire-Les Sybelles, 

The Col de la Croix de Fer was the highest point reached in the Alps in the 2012 Tour, so the leader across the summit would win the Souvenir Henri Desgrange. Much like the previous day, a large breakaway was formed after several different groups advanced clear of the main field as they approached the first climb of the day, at the Col de la Madeleine.

In total, there were 28 riders in the group at one point; at the top of the climb, the pace picked up and the group splintered into several mini-groups as 's Peter Velits scored the maximum points on offer for the climb, followed closely by  rider Fredrik Kessiakoff. Velits and Kessiakoff pulled out a 45-second advantage on the descent, but eight riders eventually bridged the gap and rejoined the duo before the Col de la Croix de Fer.  had two riders in the group, with Christophe Kern setting the pace for team-mate Pierre Rolland, and the tempo was again splitting the group up. Back in the peloton, young rider classification leader Tejay van Garderen attacked on the climb, as the benchmark for a later move by his team-mate Cadel Evans. They acquired a 30-second lead at one point before  brought Bradley Wiggins back up to them. Kessiakoff just bettered Rolland for the mountains points atop the Col de la Croix de Fer, with the peloton around two minutes behind.

Rolland crashed on the descent from the climb, having taken first place points over the summit, while Sørensen was in difficulty to stay with the lead.  rider Vincenzo Nibali tried to breach the peloton on two occasions on the final climb,  catching up with 's Jurgen Van den Broeck who had escaped with eighth stage winner, 's Thibaut Pinot. Evans cracked on the climb, losing time to Wiggins, team-mate Chris Froome and other contenders. Froome put Wiggins into difficulty at one point, but backed the pace down via his team radio. Up front, Rolland was the last remaining rider of the breakaway, and soloed to his second Tour stage win, and his team's second stage win in a row. Pinot led the yellow jersey group across the line almost a minute down, while Evans lost almost 90 seconds on Wiggins, Froome and Nibali, who filled the top three places overall at the conclusion of the stage.

Stage 12

13 July 2012 — Saint-Jean-de-Maurienne to Annonay–Davézieux, 

As had been the case in the previous two stages, there was another large breakaway group that set the tempo outside of the peloton in the early running. At its maximum, the group contained nineteen riders, but it had been reduced to eleven by the time the group reached the foot of the opening climb, the Col du Grand Cucheron.

Robert Kišerlovski of  took the maximum points on offer for the climb, to help protect the lead of the classification, held by team-mate Fredrik Kessiakoff.  rider David Moncoutié tried to bridge the gap to reach the lead group, but crashed heavily on the descent from the climb. He had to abandon the race with abrasions. Kišerlovski also took maximum points on the Col du Granier, which made Kessiakoff's lead safe for another day. With none of the riders being in overall contention, the peloton let the group go and decided not to chase them down before the finish.

None of the quintet attacked each other, and they remained as one into the final  of the stage. Kišerlovski played his hand first, launching an attack with  remaining, but Péraud closed down the move almost immediately; a secondary move took Martínez and Gautier out of the equation for the stage victory. Péraud accelerated again and Millar latched onto his wheel with Kišerlovski unable to follow the pair. Millar took the front inside the final , but Péraud remained on his wheel until just before  to go; he launched his attack, but Millar beat him to the line for his fourth individual stage victory at the Tour – his first since 2003 – and the fourth different British rider to take a stage win at the 2012 Tour. The peloton was led across the line almost eight minutes down by the top two in the points classification, 's Matthew Goss and 's Peter Sagan. Sagan protested the sprint finish of Goss, feeling that he had impeded him in the closing metres. Race officials agreed with Sagan and demoted Goss to seventh – helped in part by a one-second time gap between them and the rest of the field – and penalised him 30 points in the classification, and 30 seconds overall.

Stage 13

14 July 2012 — Saint-Paul-Trois-Châteaux to Cap d'Agde, 

This transitional stage took the Tour to the Mediterranean. The day's only categorised climb over Mont-Saint-Clair at Sète and the wind off the sea were two potential disruptions to the race in the final  of the stage.

The octet made their escape in the opening  of the stage, and their advantage eventually stemmed to a maximum of almost 10 minutes at the  mark, before  sent riders forward to the front of the peloton in order to bring the gap down. Urtasun led the group across the line at the stage's intermediate sprint point in Mas-de-Londres, but behind, points classification leader Peter Sagan was able to launch his sprint for the line before 's sprinter Matthew Goss did so, and extended his lead in the standings as a result. Mørkøv held a one-minute advantage over his former breakaway companions all the way to the foot of the Mont-Saint-Clair, but the peloton were able to close the advantage to them all before the summit of the climb.

's Cadel Evans and  rider Jurgen Van den Broeck both attacked on the Mont-Saint-Clair, and their accelerated pace ripped the peloton apart, with many riders falling off the back of the peloton. Around 25 riders remained in the lead group, with only Sagan and Van Den Broeck's team-mate André Greipel out of the sprinters making the group. Wiggins led out team-mate Edvald Boasson Hagen for the sprint, but Greipel launched his own off his wheel and managed to fend off a quick-finishing Sagan to take his third stage win of the Tour by half a wheel, the first such feat by a German rider since Erik Zabel in 2001.

Stage 14

15 July 2012 — Limoux to Foix, 

The Mur de Péguère was featuring for the first time in the Tour de France; with sections of the climb in excess of 16%. Small attacks set the course of the early running of the stage, with the field remaining as a whole for the first hour of racing after the attacks were closed down shortly after.

By the time that Sagan had crossed over the intermediate sprint line first, at Tarascon-sur-Ariège, the leaders' advantage was already over thirteen minutes, and was increasing by the kilometre due to the wet conditions on the roads. At the Port de Lers, the eleven riders were fifteen minutes clear when Cyril Gautier developed a problem with his bike and had to stop for a change of equipment, losing around 40 seconds to his ten companions. He would not bridge back to them, and ultimately lost fourteen minutes to them by the stage finish. 's Luis León Sánchez attacked on the Mur de Péguère, with only Philippe Gilbert,  rider Gorka Izagirre and Sandy Casar of  able to follow originally. Sagan later brought himself back up to the group, before Casar pulled a few seconds clear over the summit.

At the summit of the climb, carpet tacks were thrown onto the road causing as many as thirty riders to puncture, including Gilbert's team-mates Cadel Evans and Steve Cummings, while race leader Bradley Wiggins changed his bike as a precaution. As a result, Wiggins called a temporary halt to the racing on the descent. At the front, Sánchez attacked with around  remaining, and eventually soloed his way to a fourth career stage victory at the Tour. Sagan led home a group of four riders almost a minute behind, while the peloton eventually crossed the line over eighteen minutes behind Sánchez.

Stage 15

16 July 2012 — Samatan to Pau, 

The stage ran through the foothills of the Pyrenees, in the Gers and Pyrénées-Atlantiques departments. There were three minor climbs in the final third of the stage, which was expected to suit the remaining sprinters. Like the previous day, small attacks set the course of the early running of the stage, with the field remaining as a whole for the first hour of racing after the attacks were unsuccessful. The peloton did not allow them to gain an advantage of more than 30 seconds, and they were eventually brought back to the main field at the  mark.

The peloton had reduced the gap to the leaders to around five minutes at one point, but eventually decided to allow the breakaway to battle it out for stage honours. Voeckler took maximum points on all three categorised climbs prior to the closing , before Sørensen launched the first sustained attacks prior to the finish. The remaining members of the breakaway came in before the main field, with 's André Greipel leading them home 11' 50" down on Fédrigo.

Stage 16

18 July 2012 — Pau to Bagnères-de-Luchon, 

After the second and final rest day, the race entered the high mountains with the queen stage crossing two hors catégorie climbs – the Col d'Aubisque and the Col du Tourmalet – followed by the first-category climbs of the Col d'Aspin and the Col de Peyresourde, completing the so-called "Circle of Death", before dropping down to the finish in Bagnères-de-Luchon. The first rider over the Tourmalet – the highest point reached in both the Pyrenees and the 2012 Tour as a whole at  – received the Souvenir Jacques Goddet.

Voeckler and Kessiakoff led the group over the top of the Col d'Aubisque, with the group remaining together until the foot of the Col du Tourmalet. The peloton crossed the summit around ten minutes later.

Voeckler and Feillu had an advantage of almost two minutes at the bottom of the Col d'Aspin, while Martin – on his own after being the last to be dropped by the French pairing out front – was joined by Hincapie and six other riders. With added pressure from Sørensen and  rider Jens Voigt, Kessiakoff was dropped by the group, and aided the efforts for Voeckler to take the lead in the mountains classification. However, with team-mates around him, he was able to rejoin the group before the final climb of the Col de Peyresourde. A third of the way up the climb, Voeckler left his companion Feillu behind, and set off on a solo attack. Evans again fell off the back of the group, as Vincenzo Nibali decided to make a preliminary attack on his rivals, 's Bradley Wiggins and Chris Froome.

Wiggins and Froome were able to make their way back up to Nibali, sandwiching him with Froome on the front and Wiggins at the back of the trio. Voeckler cemented his mountains classification lead by reaching the summit of the Col de Peyresourde first, with the remaining riders of the breakaway spread out between him and the group of Wiggins, Froome and Nibali. Sørensen trailed Voeckler by a minute-and-a-half. Nibali attacked twice more on the steepest part of the climb, but Wiggins shadowed the move and kept himself up with Nibali. At the front, Voeckler descended towards the finish in Bagnères-de-Luchon with a 1' 40" lead over Sørensen, and held the lead to the end for his second stage win of the race, and repeated his 2010 stage victory in the town. Sørensen remained 1' 40" behind in second, while  rider Gorka Izagirre bested Alexander Vinokourov for third place. Nibali, Wiggins and Froome came in seven minutes after Voeckler, while Evans lost almost five minutes to the trio, falling from fourth to seventh in the general classification behind  rider Jurgen Van den Broeck, 's Haimar Zubeldia and his own team-mate Tejay van Garderen.  rider Jan Ghyselinck finished four seconds outside the stage's cutoff time, but he was given a reprieve by the comissaires to continue in the Tour, making him the new lanterne rouge.

Stage 17

19 July 2012 — Bagnères-de-Luchon to Peyragudes, 

The final day in the mountains saw the race cross the first-category Col de Menté and the second-category Col des Ares before reaching the last hors catégorie climb of the Tour, the Port de Balès. The race then dropped down, before returning over the  uncategorised Col de Peyresourde – crossing the summit for the second consecutive day – followed by a summit finish at the Peyragudes ski resort.

Small attacks set the course of the early running of the stage, with the field remaining as a whole for the first half-hour of racing after several attacks were closed down before a gap could be established. It was not until the Col de Menté that the early foundations of a breakaway were laid with the two mountains classification combatants, 's Thomas Voeckler and Fredrik Kessiakoff of  again battling it out for points; Voeckler prevailed ahead of Kessiakoff. The two riders were also a part of a seven-rider breakaway that formed on the descent from the climb. The group was also bolstered for a time by  rider Vincenzo Nibali, third place in the general classification behind  duo Bradley Wiggins and Chris Froome, but he eventually sat up from the group as the breakaway was not likely to be given an advantage if Nibali was in the group.

A ten-rider chase group formed behind the leaders, and eventually joined up with them around halfway through the stage. Voeckler bettered Kessiakoff at the Côte de Burs, to extend his lead in the classification; the peloton were around three minutes behind, but closing gradually. Following a move by a pair of  riders, Rui Costa attacked out of the group as a set-up for his team leader Alejandro Valverde, who followed his move several kilometres later. Costa paced him for a time before Valverde went clear on his own, and built up a 35-second lead at the summit of the Port de Balès, while the peloton had closed by half a minute to trail him by around two-and-a-half minutes.

For the second ascent of the Col de Peyresourde during the race, the riders would take the climb in the opposite direction from what they had done on the previous day, before a slight descent and then the final climb to Peyragudes. Valverde held a lead of 1' 20" at the top of the uncategorised pass, with only a handful of riders remaining with the group of the maillot jaune, including the top four in the general classification. Valverde was holding his own off the front, and the gap was fluctuating between 1' 20" and 1' 30" for several kilometres as they neared the summit, which came at the flamme rouge point. 's Jurgen Van den Broeck tried to attack, but was pulled back by the Froome and Wiggins tandem, which then accelerated away from their rivals and set off after Valverde. Ultimately, they came up short due to Froome having to wait three times for Wiggins as the race leader was several metres behind his domestique on certain parts of the climb. Valverde achieved his fourth career stage victory at the Tour, nineteen seconds ahead of Froome and Wiggins, who in turn extended their advantage over the rest of the field.

Stage 18

20 July 2012 — Blagnac to Brive-la-Gaillarde, 

Despite being ranked a "flat stage", there were four ranked climbs during the day which had the potential to produce a successful break from the peloton. In the early kilometres of the stage, a group of six riders instigated the first breakaway of the day, but after the peloton allowed them to create an advantage on the roads, they were brought back to the confines of the peloton not long later. There was then an uneventful period in the action, with no major attacks going off the front, until the first categorised climb of the day, at the Côte de Saint-Georges.

On the climb itself,  rider Nick Nuyens and 's Yukiya Arashiro attacked up the hill, before they were joined by fourteen other riders to create the second major breakaway of the day's stage. The best-placed rider amongst the group was Rui Costa of the  – just under half an hour behind the race leader Bradley Wiggins of  – who was fresh from his set-up work for team-mate Alejandro Valverde the previous day. Around halfway through the stage, the advantage between the sixteen leaders and the main field reached its highest point of the day, at the 3' 30" mark, before  and  set the tempo to start bringing the leaders back to the peloton. In the peloton, several riders fell to the ground after a dog ran into their path, slowing the pace as a whole. Among those involved was 's Philippe Gilbert, who had to be restrained when back on his feet.  sent their riders forward to set the pace on the front of the group in the hopes of setting Peter Sagan up for a fourth stage victory of the race, and the gap reduced under two minutes inside of  remaining.

At the head of the race, 's David Millar attacked on the Côte de Souillac, where moves from Arashiro and Wiggins' team-mate Edvald Boasson Hagen followed not long later. Roche and Sánchez attacked for the line, but both riders were usurped by the finish of  sprinter Mark Cavendish following a lead-out from Boasson Hagen. Cavendish went around the outside of the pairing and took his 22nd Tour stage victory on the line, matching the tallies of Lance Armstrong, and André Darrigade for fourth place in the all-time Tour stage wins list, and tying Darrigade's record for victories by a sprinter. 's Matthew Goss and Sagan also managed to get ahead of Sánchez and Roche in the closing stages, for second and third places respectively, but were around ten lengths behind Cavendish at the finish.

Stage 19

21 July 2012 — Bonneval to Chartres, (ITT)

The penultimate stage of the Tour was the final individual time trial with good roads into the centre of the city of Chartres. With other noted specialists within the time trial discipline having already abandoned the race, the top two riders in the general classification –  pairing Bradley Wiggins and Chris Froome – were expected to be the favourites for the stage, having finished first and second in the ninth stage time trial. As was customary of time trial stages, the riders set off in reverse order from where they were ranked in the general classification at the end of the previous stage.

Engoulvent recorded a time of 1 hour, 12 minutes and 49 seconds for the course as he was first to reach the line; but his lead was short-lived as several minutes later,  rider Julien Fouchard went round the course over two minutes quicker than the time of Engoulvent. 's Johan Vansummeren was the first rider to record a time below 1 hour and 10 minutes with a time of 1 hour, 9 minutes and 24 seconds, before  rider Patrick Gretsch recorded a time almost three minutes quicker, having passed the two riders that started directly before him – at one-minute intervals – on the course, and another on the finish line. Gretsch's time held for a considerable amount of time – around 2 hours – and was ultimately good enough for him to place sixth in the final stage results. It was not until the 88th rider to start the course that his time was beaten. Luis León Sánchez of  set the best time at each of the three intermediate time-checks along the  parcours and eventually crossed the finish line in a time of 1 hour, 6 minutes and 3 seconds, to surpass Gretsch's time by thirty-eight seconds.

The Spanish national champion's time held right into the final riders to take to the course, now at three-minute intervals for the last 14 riders. 's Tejay van Garderen, the holder of the white jersey for the young rider classification leader, went beneath Sánchez's time at the first split, but faded on the rest of the course and eventually finished 44 seconds outside of his time in third place. He had already passed his team-mate Cadel Evans, who had started three minutes ahead, on course, and the Boulder, Colorado native later dedicated his performance to the victims of the shooting in nearby Aurora. Only Froome and Wiggins beat the time of van Garderen at the first time-point, with Wiggins beating Froome by a dozen seconds; Wiggins continued to extend his lead on course, holding a 54-second buffer at the second time-check, and 1' 15" at the third. Froome crossed the line in a time of 1 hour, 5 minutes and 29 seconds to beat Sánchez's time by 34 seconds, but Wiggins achieved his second stage win of the race, adding one second to his advantage between the third time-check and the finish; punching the air as he crossed the finish line. The only change in positions for the general classification inside the top ten was Evans being passed for sixth place by 's Haimar Zubeldia – despite nearly hitting a barrier during his pass through the course – by a margin of eight seconds.

Stage 20
22 July 2012 — Rambouillet to Paris (Champs-Élysées), 

The Tour concluded with the now-customary stage finish on the Champs-Élysées in Paris. In keeping with tradition, the final stage began at a slow pace, and was a largely ceremonial procession through the suburbs of Paris.

Hondo led the field across the final intermediate sprint point of the race, with Voigt just behind. Hondo did not remain out front however, as Voigt was eventually joined by ten other riders to form the breakaway, with their advantage eventually reaching a maximum of around thirty seconds in the closing stages. Hondo later crashed on the final lap, along with  rider Mikaël Cherel, but both riders eventually remounted to finish the stage. The lead-out train for Mark Cavendish, which included race leader Wiggins, held the lead of the race through the final corners, and he won the final stage for the fourth successive year, becoming the first incumbent world champion to win on the Champs-Élysées. His 23rd stage victory allowed him to move into fourth place on the all-time Tour stage wins list, while the leaders of the four classifications finished in the peloton to secure their victories, and the traditional prize-giving was made shortly after the race.

Notes and references

Footnotes

References

Sources

External links

 

2012 Tour de France
Tour de France stages